Oasis Academy Silvertown is a coeducational secondary free school located in North Woolwich in Newham, in London, England. It is part of the Oasis Community Learning. It opened to pupils in September 2014. It moved to this site in September 2016, and will move to its permanent home, in Silvertown in 2022. It was rated 'Good' in its first Ofsted inspection in 2017.

History 
Oasis Academy Silvertown opened in September 2014. It is smaller than the average-sized mixed comprehensive school within the Oasis Community Learning multi-academy trust. Since it opened, the school has moved between temporary sites and is currently located on Rymill Street, next to King George V DLR station. Physical education takes place at Newham Leisure Centre, as there is no on-site sports hall or playing field. Through the trust, the school has received support from other Oasis Community Learning schools.

Oasis has a long term strategy for enhancing the performance of its schools. 
 It has devised a standard curriculum, that each school can safely adopt knowing it will deliver the National Curriculum. 
 It has invested in staff training so they are focused on improving the outcomes for the students
 Horizons, through its Horizons scheme it is providing each member of staff and student with a tablet computer.

Future building 
In 2022, the school will move to its permanent site on North Woolwich Road, close to West Silvertown DLR station. It is being designed by Rivington Street Studios to BB103 Area Guidelines for Schools and will achieve a BREEAM “Excellent” rating.
It is to be a 5 storey 'super block', built on the site of a former fire station. Construction began in October 2020, with the building topped out in July 2021.

References

External links
 The school website

Free schools in London
Secondary schools in the London Borough of Newham
Silvertown
Educational institutions established in 2014
2014 establishments in England